The first season of the Bad Girls Club debuted on December 5, 2006, and concluded on April 24, 2007, followed by two specials. Production of the season began in June 2006, and was located in Los Angeles, California.

Cast 
The season began with seven original bad girls, of which one left voluntarily and two were removed by production. Three replacement bad girls were introduced in their absences later in the season.

Duration of Cast

Episodes

Notes

References

Bad Girls Club seasons
2006 American television seasons
2007 American television seasons
Television shows set in Los Angeles